The Chino Valley Review is a newspaper in Chino Valley, Arizona, United States. It is owned by The Daily Courier, a Western News & Info publication. It has a circulation of about 6,000.

References

External links
 Official website

Newspapers published in Arizona